The Three Cups was a historic public house and hotel which played a prominent role in Harwich until it was converted to a private house in 1995. The current building was built around 1500, but there are more speculative claims that a public house existed on the site before this. The building is located at 64 Church Street, next to St Nicholas' church.

Celebrations marked at the Three Cups
The Three Cups has frequently been the venue of the celebration of significant events over the years:

Launch and relaunch of ships
 Launch of HMS Sultan (1775), 23 December 1775.
 Relaunch of HMS Magicienne, 18 January 1793.

References

Harwich
Grade II listed buildings in Essex
Pubs in Essex